The eighth season of the Russian reality talent show The Voice premiered on October 11, 2019 on Channel One. Dmitry Nagiev returned as the show's presenter. On August 26, 2019, Channel One announced that Valery Syutkin, Polina Gagarina, Sergey Shnurov, and Konstantin Meladze became the coaches.

Asker Berbekov was named winner of the season. With his victory, Konstantin Meladze became the second coach to win more than one season, behind Alexander Gradsky. For the first time ever, the final four artists were all male.

Coaches and presenter

On August 26, 2019, Channel One announced that Sergey Shnurov and Konstantin Meladze will be rejoined as the coaches by Polina Gagarina, who returned after a two-season break, and Valery Syutkin, who replaced Basta as a new coach for the show.

Dmitry Nagiev returned for his 8th season as the presenter.

Teams
Colour key

Blind auditions
The feature The Best coach of the season (in each episode) was applied again this season.
Colour key

The coaches performed "Геленджик" at the start of the show.

The Battles
The Battle Rounds started on November 22, 2019. No steal were available. Contestants who win their battle would advance to the Knockout rounds.
Colour key

The Knockouts
The Knockout Rounds started on December 6, 2019. Similar to the previous season, each coach pairs three artists into one knockout with only one contestant from the trio advances to the next round and also can steal one losing artist from another coach. The top 12 contestants moved on to the Quarterfinal.
Colour key

Live shows 
Colour key:

Week 1: Top 12 — Quarterfinal (December 20)
The Live Top 12 Quarterfinal comprised episode 11. The top twelve artists performed, with two artists from each team advancing based on the sum of the viewers' and coach's votes.

Week 2: Top 8 — Semifinal (December 27)
The top eight artists performed on December 27, 2019, with one artist from each team advancing to the Final based on the sum of the viewers' and coach's votes

Week 3: Final (January 1)

Best Coach
Colour key

Reception

Rating

Notes

References

2019 Russian television seasons
The Voice (Russian TV series)